This is a list of Polish television related events from 2006.

Events
14 May - M jak miłość actor Rafał Mroczek and his partner Aneta Piotrowska win the third series of Taniec z Gwiazdami.
12 November - The Dzień Dobry TVN presenter Kinga Rusin and her partner Stefano Terrazzino win the fourth series of Taniec z Gwiazdami.

Debuts

Television shows

1990s
Klan (1997–present)

2000s
M jak miłość (2000–present)
Na Wspólnej (2003–present)
Pierwsza miłość (2004–present)
Dzień Dobry TVN (2005–present)
Taniec z gwiazdami (2005-2011, 2014–present)

Ending this year
Pensjonat pod Różą (2004-2006)

Births

Deaths

See also
2006 in Poland